Afin (also Romanized as Āfīn; also known as Afih) is a village in Afin Rural District, Zohan District, Zirkuh County, South Khorasan Province, Iran. At the 2006 census, its population was 1,465, in 415 families.

References 

Populated places in Zirkuh County